Murphy Vaiaoga Utuariki Taramai (born 17 August 1992) is a New Zealand rugby union player, of Cook Islands and Samoan heritage, who currently plays as a loose forward for  in New Zealand's domestic Mitre 10 Cup and for the  in the international Super Rugby competition.   He previously represented the All Blacks Sevens team during the 2014–15 Sevens World Series.

Youth career

Taramai was initially a professional rugby league footballer of some pedigree during his days attending Upper Hutt College just outside of Wellington.  His side remained 3 years unbeaten with Taramai playing a key role in the side.   This form earned him a trial with NRL side, the Penrith Panthers in 2011.   Unfortunately for him, things didn't work out as well as expected in Australia and he returned home to New Zealand in 2012 and turned his attention to rugby sevens.

Domestic Sevens career

Upon returning to New Zealand in 2012 he began playing sevens rugby with Wellington and was a member of the side which lifted the national title in 2014.

Senior career

Taramai played one game for  during their largely chaotic and ill-fated campaign in 2014.   Unable to earn a contract in 2015, he headed north to join up with  where he enjoyed a memorable debut season in 2016.   He started all 12 matches as Harbour lifted the Mitre 10 Cup Championship and earned promotion to the Premiership ahead of the 2017 season.

Super Rugby

International

Taramai represented New Zealand at sevens level between 2014 and 2015, appearing at 4 tournaments in which he played 19 matches and scored 1 try.

Career honours

North Harbour

Mitre 10 Cup Championship – 2016

References

1992 births
Living people
New Zealand rugby union players
Rugby union number eights
Wellington rugby union players
North Harbour rugby union players
People educated at Upper Hutt College
New Zealand international rugby sevens players
New Zealand male rugby sevens players
Rugby union flankers
Blues (Super Rugby) players
American Raptors players
Hurricanes (rugby union) players
Shimizu Koto Blue Sharks players